Panovo is a rural locality (a village) in Vozhbalskoye Rural Settlement, Totemsky District, Vologda Oblast, Russia. The population was 30 as of 2002.

Geography 
Panovo is located 46 km northwest of Totma (the district's administrative centre) by road. Srodino is the nearest rural locality.

References 

Rural localities in Totemsky District